Ana Titlić (born 13 June 1952 in Gornja Vrba) is a former Yugoslav/Croatian handball player who competed in the 1980 Summer Olympics.

In 1980 she won the silver medal with the Yugoslav team. She played two matches.

External links
profile

1952 births
Living people
Yugoslav female handball players
Croatian female handball players
Handball players at the 1980 Summer Olympics
Olympic handball players of Yugoslavia
Olympic silver medalists for Yugoslavia
Olympic medalists in handball
Medalists at the 1980 Summer Olympics